Class collaboration is a principle of social organization based upon the belief that the division of society into a hierarchy of social classes is a positive and essential aspect of civilization.

Fascist support 
Class collaboration is one of the main pillars of social architecture in fascism. In the words of Benito Mussolini, fascism "affirms the irremediable, fruitful and beneficent inequality of men". Given this premise, fascists conclude that the preservation of social hierarchy is in the interests of all classes and therefore all classes should collaborate in its defense. Both the lower and the higher classes should accept their roles and perform their respective duties.

In fascist thought, the principle of class collaboration is combined with ultranationalism. The stability and the prosperity of the nation was seen as the ultimate purpose of collaboration between classes.

Communist opposition 
Communists are ideologically and fundamentally opposed to class collaboration, advocating for class struggle, and generally favoring a classless society instead.

Whereas the doctrine of class struggle urges the lower classes to overthrow the ruling class and the existing social order for the purpose of establishing equality, the doctrine of class collaboration urges them to accept inequality as part of the natural state of things and preserve the social order. Furthermore, it holds that the state alone reconciles class antagonisms in society and that the strife which gives rise to communism can be harmonized.

Some Marxists use the term class collaboration as a pejorative term describing working class organisations that do not pursue class struggle. In this sense, the term echoes the connotations of collaborationism. At the same time, communists do not necessarily reject all alliances between classes. Some communists argue that in a country with a large peasant population, the transition to communism can be accomplished by an alliance between two classes, namely the peasantry and the proletariat, united against the bourgeois class. Mao Zedong's New Democracy concept calls for "the peasantry, the proletariat, the petty bourgeoisie and national and patriotic elements from the bourgeoisie to collectively operate for the building of a socialist society".

Other cases 
Modern social democracy (Third-Way) and one-nation conservatism also support class collaboration.

See also 

 Bourgeois nationalism
 Burgfriedenspolitik
 Corporatism
 Labor aristocracy
 Nordic model
 Patriarchy
 Professional–managerial class
 Solidarism
 Volksgemeinschaft
 Welfare chauvinism

References 

Corporatism
Economics of fascism
Paternalistic conservatism
Political terminology
Social democracy
Right-wing politics